Revolution is an American science fiction dramatic television series. The series was created by Eric Kripke and produced by J. J. Abrams and Bryan Burk. Jon Favreau directed the pilot episode. The series began on Monday September 17, 2012, at 10 pm.
On October 2, 2012, NBC picked it up for a full season of 22 episodes, which was later reduced to 20 episodes.
On April 26, 2013, the series was renewed by NBC for a second season of 22 episodes to air in a new time slot of Wednesdays at 8PM. The second season premiered on September 25, 2013.

On May 9, 2014, NBC announced that Revolution had been canceled before the remaining two episodes aired. In total, 42 episodes aired over two seasons.

Series overview

Episodes

Season 1 (2012–13)

Season 2 (2013–14)

Digital comics
Between May 4 and June 15, 2015, four separate digital chapters were released fortnightly. Each of the four chapters have a specifically designed cover, all illustrated by DC Comics artist Angel Hernandez.

Ratings
Altogether a total of 24.2 million American viewers watched all or some of the premiere episode and/or the encore two days later.

Season 1 (2012–13)

Season 2 (2013–14)

References

External links
 
 

2012 American television seasons
2013 American television seasons
2014 American television seasons
Lists of American science fiction television series episodes